Neiva Regente is a Brazilian propeller-driven four-seat light utility aircraft manufactured by Indústria Aeronáutica Neiva.

History
The design was started in 1959 for a four-seat cabin monoplane aircraft with a high wing and fixed undercarriage. The prototype, designated the Neiva Regente 360C, was first flown on 7 September 1961 with a 145 hp (108 kW) Continental O-300 piston engine.

The type was ordered into production by the Brazilian Air Force with a more powerful 180 hp (134 kW) Lycoming O-360-A1D engine. Eighty aircraft were built originally designated the U-42 (later changed to C-42) for the utility role. First delivery occurred in February 1975.
Neiva developed a three-seat Air Observation Post version for the Air Force, designated the Regente 420L. Its tailcone was lowered in order to improve visibility, and it used a more powerful Continental IO-360D 210 hp engine. The aircraft was first flown in January 1967 as the YL-42.  Forty were built for the Brazilian Air Force as the L-42. It had provision to carry light bombs or rockets on underwing hardpoints.

Neiva also developed a four-seat civil version designated the Lanceiro. The prototype (Registered PP-ZAH) first flew in 1970, followed by production aircraft in 1973. The company's subsequent involvement with Embraer resulted in the Lanceiro's program termination.

Variants
Regente 360C - utility version (80 built)
U-42 - military designation of the Regente 360C
C-42 - military designation changed from U-42
Regente 420L - Air Observation Post version (40 built)
L-42 - military designation of the Regente 420L
Lanciero - civil version (2 built)

Operators

Brazilian Air Force

Zimbabwe Air Force

Specifications (C-42)

References

External links

Regente
Single-engined tractor aircraft
High-wing aircraft
1960s Brazilian aircraft
1960s Brazilian military utility aircraft
1960s Brazilian military aircraft
1960s Brazilian civil utility aircraft
Aircraft first flown in 1961